Conwy County Borough Council is the local authority for Conwy County Borough, one of the principal areas of Wales.

History
Conwy County Borough was created in 1996 under the Local Government (Wales) Act 1994, which replaced the previous two tier system of counties and districts with principal areas (each designated either a "county" or a "county borough"), whose councils perform the functions previously divided between the county and district councils. The county borough of Conwy was created to cover the area of the district of Aberconwy from the county of Gwynedd and the district of Colwyn from the county of Clwyd, except for the parishes of Cefnmeiriadog and Trefnant, which went to the Denbighshire. The government originally named the new area "Aberconwy and Colwyn". During the transition to the new system, the shadow authority requested a change of name from "Aberconwy and Colwyn" to "Conwy", taking the name from both the River Conwy which runs through the area and the town of Conwy, where the new council established its headquarters. The government confirmed the change with effect from 2 April 1996, one day after the new council came into being.

Political control
The first election to the new council was held in 1995, initially operating as a shadow authority before coming into its powers on 1 April 1996. Political control of the council since 1996 has been as follows:

Leadership
The leaders of the council since 2005 have been:

Current composition 
As of 5 May 2022.

Elections
Since 2012, elections have been held every five years.

Party with the most elected councillors in bold. Coalition agreements in notes column.

Premises
The council is based at Bodlondeb, which was built as a house in 1877 on Bangor Road in Conwy, just outside the town walls and set in substantial grounds stretching down to the River Conwy. The house had been bought in 1937 by the former Conwy Municipal Borough Council and converted into a civic centre. The building passed to Aberconwy District Council under the 1974 reforms and then to Conwy County Borough Council on its creation in 1996. In 2018 the council also opened a new building called Coed Pella on Conway Road in Colwyn Bay to house many of the council's departments, replacing several other office buildings.

Electoral divisions 

The county borough is divided into 38 electoral wards returning 59 councillors.  Few communities in Conwy are coterminous with electoral wards.  The following table lists council wards, communities and associated geographical areas.  Communities with a community council are indicated with a '*':

References

External links
Conwy Council (official site)

 
Conwy county borough